Darwin Centre may refer to:

Places

In Australia 
Darwin Entertainment Centre, an arts centre in Darwin, Australia.
Darwin Convention Centre, a convention centre in Darwin, Australia.
Darwin Correctional Centre, a prison in Darwin, Australia.

In the United Kingdom 
Natural History Museum, London#The Darwin Centre, education and research centre of the Natural History Museum, London, England.
Darwin Shopping Centre, a shopping centre in Shrewsbury, England.
Darwin Centre for Young People, a CAMHS Tier 4 adolescent inpatient unit based in Cambridge, England.

See also 
Darwin (disambiguation) for other places called Darwin.